Delroy Clarke (born December 29, 1982) is a Canadian football cornerback who is currently a free agent. He was drafted in the fourth round of the 2008 CFL Draft by the Toronto Argonauts. He played CIS Football for the Ottawa Gee-Gees.

Early years 
Clarke was born in Kingston, Jamaica, moved to Scarborough in the city of Toronto, Ontario, as a teenager, and attended West Hill Collegiate Institute for grades 10, 11, and 12. He was an all-around athlete in school, playing varsity soccer, rugby, and track and field for West Hill. He first played football in the twelfth grade, after a serious leg injury cost him a soccer United States college athletics scholarship. Upset and not wanting to play soccer anymore, friends convinced him to try football. In his only year of high school football, he made enough of an impact to earn United States NCAA Division II scholarship offers but opted to stay in Canada and play for the University of Ottawa.

Professional career 
Clarke was drafted in the fourth round of the 2008 CFL Draft by the Toronto Argonauts. He played for three seasons in Toronto before he was traded to the Edmonton Eskimos for a fourth round draft pick in the 2012 CFL Draft. Following two seasons with the Eskimos, he was released and sat out of football in 2013. He was later signed by the expansion Ottawa Redblacks on January 13, 2014. He was released by the Redblacks on June 4, 2014.

After Football 
Clarke joined the Royal Canadian Mounted Police after his release from the RedBlacks. He spent the last several years stationed in Shelbourne, Nova Scotia.

References

External links 
Ottawa Redblacks bio

1982 births
Living people
Black Canadian players of Canadian football
Canadian football defensive backs
Canadian players of Canadian football
Edmonton Elks players
Ottawa Gee-Gees football players
Ottawa Redblacks players
Sportspeople from Kingston, Jamaica
Toronto Argonauts players
Jamaican emigrants to Canada